Julika Rudelius (born 1968) is an internationally exhibiting German-born video and performance artist who lives and works in Amsterdam, Netherlands, and New York. Rudelius' photographic and video work examines complex notions of emotional dependency, social power, abuse, identity, and cultural hegemony.

Biography
Rudelius was born in Cologne, Germany, in 1968. She studied at the Gerrit Rietveld Academy in Amsterdam where she received her B.F.A. in photography in 1998, followed by a residency at the Rijksakademie van beeldenden kunsten in 1999-2000 and the International Studio & Curatorial Program (ISCP) in New York in 2006.

Exhibitions
Julika Rudelius has exhibited in numerous museums including Tate Modern; the ZKM; Van Abbe Museum; Stedelijk Museum; the Frankfurter Kunstverein; ; Centre Culturel Suisse; Reinhard Hauff Galerie; Galerie Manuela Klercks; ; The John Institute; Bard Museum at Bard College; Aeroplastics Contemporary; Frans Hals Museum; Figge von Rosen Gallery, and New York's Swiss Institute.

References

1968 births
Living people
21st-century German artists
21st-century German women artists
German contemporary artists
German performance artists
German video artists
Artists from Cologne
Gerrit Rietveld Academie alumni